Czesław Rajtar (26 May 1929 – 20 January 2017) was a Polish footballer. He played in one match for the Poland national football team in 1952.

References

External links
 

1929 births
2017 deaths
Polish footballers
Poland international footballers
Place of birth missing
Association footballers not categorized by position